Mario Franjić (born 23 March 1962) is a Bosnian bobsledder. He competed at the 1984 Winter Olympics, representing Yugoslavia, and at the 1998 Winter Olympics, representing Bosnia and Herzegovina. 

During the 1998 Winter Olympics which took place in Nagano, Japan, Mario was announced the flag-bearer for the Bosnian Olympic team and carried the flag at the opening ceremony.

References

1962 births
Living people
Yugoslav male bobsledders
Bosnia and Herzegovina male bobsledders
Olympic bobsledders of Yugoslavia
Olympic bobsledders of Bosnia and Herzegovina
Bobsledders at the 1984 Winter Olympics
Bobsledders at the 1998 Winter Olympics
Sportspeople from Sarajevo
Croats of Bosnia and Herzegovina